Annette Kansy (born 13 June 1955) is a former East German pair skater.

Competing with partner Axel Salzmann, Kansy competed at the 1972 Winter Olympics. They twice won the silver medal at the East German Figure Skating Championships.

Results

Pairs with Salzmann

External links
Sports-Reference.com

1955 births
Sportspeople from Dresden
German female pair skaters
Figure skaters at the 1972 Winter Olympics
Olympic figure skaters of East Germany
Living people